Đ (lowercase: đ, Latin alphabet), known as crossed D or dyet, is a letter formed from the base character D/d overlaid with a crossbar. Crossing was used to create eth (ð), but eth has an uncial as its base whereas đ is based on the straight-backed roman d, like in  Sámi Languages and  Vietnamese. Crossed d is a letter in the alphabets of several languages and is used in linguistics as a voiced dental fricative.

Appearance 

In the lowercase, the crossbar is usually drawn through the ascender, but when used as a phonetic symbol it may be preferred to draw it through the bowl, in which case it is known as a barred d. In some African languages' orthographies, such as that of Moro, the barred d is preferred.

In the uppercase, the crossbar normally crosses just the left stem, but in Vietnamese and Moro it may sometimes cross the entire letter.

The DE ligature should not be confused with the Đ. For example, DE .

Uses by language

African languages 
A lowercase đ appeared alongside a lowercase retroflex D in a 1982 revision of the African reference alphabet. This revision of the alphabet eliminated uppercase forms, so there was no conflict between ɖ and đ.

Latin 
Đ was used in Medieval Latin to mark abbreviations of words containing the letter d. For example,  could stand for  "of the heirs". Similar crossbars were added to other letters to form abbreviations.

South Slavic languages 

The crossed d was introduced by the Serbian philologist Đuro Daničić in 1878 for use in Serbo-Croatian in his Dictionary of the Croatian or Serbian Language, replacing the older digraphs dj and gj. Daničić modeled the letter after the Icelandic and Anglo-Saxon letter eth, albeit representing a different sound, the affricate . In 1892 it was officially introduced in Croatian and Slavonian schools (in the Habsburg Kingdom of Croatia-Slavonia where the Croatian language was official) and so definitively added to Gaj’s Latin alphabet. The letter thereafter gradually entered daily use, spreading throughout Serbo-Croatian and then to Macedonian (its Latin transliterations are heavily influenced by Serbo-Croatian from the Yugoslav period).

The crossed d is today considered a distinct letter, and is placed between Dž and E in alphabetical order. Its Cyrillic equivalent is Ђ ђ. Its partial equivalent in Macedonian is Ѓ ѓ (because only some dialects contain the  sound). When a true đ is not available or desired, it is transcribed as dj in modern Serbo-Croatian, and as gj in Macedonian. The use of dj in place of đ used to be more common in Serbo-Croatian texts, but it is falling out of practice.

Sámi languages 
In the present-day orthographies of Northern Sámi, Inari Sámi and Skolt Sámi, đ represents the fricative . It is considered a distinct letter and placed between D and E in alphabetical order.

Vietnamese 

Đ is the seventh letter of the Vietnamese alphabet, after D and before E. Traditionally, digraphs and trigraphs like CH and NGH were considered letters as well, making Đ the eighth letter. Đ is a letter in its own right, rather than a ligature or letter-diacritic combination; therefore, đá would come after dù in any alphabetical listing.

Đ represents a voiced alveolar implosive or, according to Thompson (1959), a preglottalized voiced alveolar stop.

The Vietnamese alphabet was formally described for the first time in the 17th-century text , attributed to a Portuguese Jesuit missionary, possibly Francisco de Pina or Filipe Sibin. This passage about the letter Đ was later incorporated into Alexandre de Rhodes' seminal :

On older typewriters,  was located where  would be in the French AZERTY layout. Alternatively, a hyphen can be overstruck onto a D.

On computers without support for a Vietnamese character set or Unicode, Đ is encoded as DD and đ as dd according to the Vietnamese Quoted-Readable standard. In the absence of an input method, the TCVN 6064:1995 and Microsoft Windows Vietnamese keyboard layouts map ZA0-09 ( on a U.S. keyboard) to đ, or Đ when holding down . The Windows layout also maps ZA0-11 to ₫.

Other modes of communication also have dedicated representations of Đ. In the Vietnamese manual alphabet, Đ is produced by touching the thumb to the index finger. In Morse code, it is rendered – · · – · ·, corresponding to Telex's "DD".

Other uses

Phonetic transcription 

The lowercase đ is used in some phonetic transcription schemes to represent a voiced dental fricative  (English th in this). Eth (ð) is more commonly used for this purpose, but the crossed d has the advantage of being able to be typed on a standard typewriter, by overlaying a hyphen over a d.

Currency symbols 

A minuscule form of the letter, đ, is the symbol of the đồng, the currency of Vietnam, by a 1953 decree by Hồ Chí Minh. The South Vietnamese đồng, on the other hand, was symbolized "Đ.", in majuscule. In Vietnamese, the đồng sign is written after the amount in superscript, often underlined.

The uppercase form, Ð, is used as the currency symbol for the cryptocurrency Dogecoin.

Chemistry 

Dispersity is represented by the symbol Đ, and is a measure of the heterogeneity of sizes of molecules or particles in a mixture, referring to either molecular mass or degree of polymerization.

Disambiguation 

This is similar to writing Z or 7 with a bar to distinguish them from 2 and 1 respectively.

Computer encoding 

In Unicode, both crossed d and barred d are considered glyph variants of U+0111.

Unicode has a distinct code point for the visually very similar capital eth, Ð, U+00D0, which can lead to confusion.

As part of WGL4, Đ and đ can be expected to display correctly even on older Windows systems.

See also 
Eth (Ð and ð), used in the Faroese and Icelandic languages
African D
Ɨ ɨ
U bar

Notes

References 

Palaeography
South Slavic languages
Sámi languages
Vietnamese language
Vietnamese alphabets
D stroke
D stroke